Richard Mawuli Koku Quashigah (born 16 October 1968) is a Ghanaian politician and member of the Seventh Parliament of the Fourth Republic of Ghana representing the Keta Constituency in the Volta Region on the ticket of the National Democratic Congress.

Personal life 
Quashigah is a Christian (Action Chapel Int.). He is married (with one child)Richard, was the  NDC Member of Parliament, Keta Constituency, from 7 January 2013 to 7 January 2021,  he was the member of the Public Accounts Committee as well as the Communications Committee of Parliament. He is also the Deputy Ranking on Parliament's Committee on Employment, Social Welfare and State Enterprises. He is also Vice Chairman of the Ghana/Korea Parliamentary Friendship Association.

Early life and education 
Quashigah was born on 16 October 1968. He hails from  Kedzi-Keta, a town in the Volta Region of Ghana. He entered University of Wales, Cardiff, UK and obtained his master's degree in International Journalism in 2002.

Politics 
Richard, the NDC Member of Parliament, Keta Constituency, since January 2013, is a member of the Public Accounts Committee as well as the Communications Committee of Parliament. He is also the Deputy Ranking on Parliament's Committee on Employment, Social Welfare and State Enterprises. He is also Vice Chairman of the Ghana/Korea Parliamentary Friendship Association.

Richard in January 2010 was elected as the National Propaganda Secretary of the NDC, serving a four-year term in that capacity; (that position is now designated as National Communication Officer. He proposed the motion for the change of name).

Earlier, Richard was the Greater Accra Regional Propaganda Secretary and has since the year 1996 through to 2006 been a member of the National Publicity Committee of the NDC. Subsequently, in 2007, Richard was a member and convener of the National Communications Committee of the NDC.

During the NDC campaign 2008, working to Madam Hannah Tetteh, Richard was in charge of building documentaries, T V commercials, media purchase and placement, media monitoring as well as scheduling of NDC spokespersons.

Richard has been and still is a member of the Keta Constituency of the NDC.

Professional Services 
 Richard has served as Senior Editor and correspondent for the nation's broadcaster, GBC as well as was correspondent for the English Service of Radio France International (RFI). Richard Mawuli Quashigah, with years of successful media work experience and communicating with multiple publics, has trained people on how to be better communicators.  Richard has been a resource person for Africa Project Development Facility of the International Finance Corporation (IFC) of the World Bank's Corporate Tune-Up Programmes for senior managers of the Ghana Ports Authority (GPHA) and Ghana Post, Export Promotion Council among others on various topics including Marketing, Customer Care and Effective Communication.  Richard was also a resource person for a number of Short Courses organized by the Consultancy / Skills Based Unit of the Institute of Professional Studies Legon, Ghana (IPS) and has had a stint with the Institute of Public Relations Ghana (IPR) as guest lecturer.  Richard produced and directed series of TV documentaries; among them is one on the investment and tourism potential of the Eastern Region.  As a Senior Programmes Facilitator with Yankah & Associates between 2004 and 2005, Richard organized and prepared workshop/seminar/short course reports including corporate tune-up progammes financed by APDF of IFC of World Bank.  Whilst with Yankah & Associates, Richard in the year 2005, facilitated media publicity for the 13th African Regional Organisation for Standardization (ARSO) as well as produced a 30- minute video documentary on same. He also facilitated media publicity for the 1st Stakeholders Forum for the Social Security & National Insurance Trust (SSNIT).  Since 2010, Richard has been a resource person for a series of seminars for African journalists on “Covering elections and political PR”, organized by the German-based International Institute of Journalism (Deutsche Gesellschaft fur Internationale).  Richard, a graduate of Cardiff University (UK), has been a guest lecturer at the Institute of Public Relations Ghana (IPR) and was a part-time lecturer at the African Institute of Journalism and Communications (now University College of Journalism and Communications) as well as Zenith University College.  In 2004 as well as in 2008 which were elections years in Ghana, Richard produced campaign radio jingles, TV Adverts and TV documentaries for a leading Ghanaian political party; the National Democratic Congress (NDC).  Richard holds a dissertation-based master's degree in International Journalism (“Ghana: Elections Latest - How to Win and Lose Elections”), two diplomas in PR/Adverting/Marketing and International Broadcasting Systems, from the Ghana Institute of Journalism and International Institute of Journalism, Berlin Brandenburg, respectively. In 2005, Richard obtained a 'Trainer of Trainers' certificate for university teachers from the International Institute of Journalism, Berlin.  He also obtained a certificate on Report & Research Writing from the Institute of Statistical, Social and Economic Research of the University of Ghana in the year 2006 among others.  Richard was host of " Focus", an intellectual talk show on Radio Ghana. He has been a guest or host on several radio/TV news/talk programs.  Richard has been a columnist, writing on politics, “Winning Strategies” in a Ghanaian newspaper ‘The Heritage’. He also has to his credit articles in several other Ghanaian newspapers and “Ammanee” - a US Public Affairs monthly Magazine.  Richard, with immense experience in building a comprehensive public relations program, including the development and implementation of a strategic marketing communications plan, also has huge interest in poverty alleviation and agricultural projects and programmers.  Richard with varied international experiences; is a member of the Commonwealth University teachers Association, Ghana Journalists Association and University Teachers Association of Ghana among others.

References

Ghanaian MPs 2017–2021
1968 births
Living people
National Democratic Congress (Ghana) politicians